Luther Thomas Ingram (November 30, 1937 – March 19, 2007) was an American R&B and soul singer-songwriter.  His most successful record, "(If Loving You Is Wrong) I Don't Want to Be Right", reached No. 1 on the Billboard R&B chart and No. 3 on the Hot 100 in 1972.

Life and career
Luther Thomas Ingram was born in Jackson, Tennessee on November 30, 1937. His family moved to Alton, Illinois in 1947. Ingram's early interest in music led to formation of a gospel group, the Alton Crusaders, which included his brothers Archie and Richard. They eventually began singing doo-wop, and accompanied by bandleader Ike Turner, they recorded as the Gardenias for Federal Records in 1956.

In 1965, Ingram recorded his first solo record. His first three recordings failed to chart but that changed when he signed for KoKo Records in the late 1960s, and his first hit "My Honey And Me" peaked at #55 on the Billboard Hot 100 on 14 February 1970.  Many of his songs appeared in the pop and R&B charts, even though Koko was only a small label, owned by his manager and record producer, Johnny Baylor.  Koko and Baylor were closely associated with the Memphis based Stax Records label during the height of its commercial success.

Ingram is best known for the hit, "(If Loving You Is Wrong) I Don't Want to Be Right", written by Homer Banks, Carl Hampton and Raymond Jackson. The song reached number one on Billboards R&B chart and peaked at number three on that publication's Hot 100 chart in the summer of 1972.  The track stayed in the Hot 100 for 18 weeks, ultimately selling a reported four million copies. The song was later successfully covered by Millie Jackson, David Ruffin, and Barbara Mandrell; it has also been recorded by Bobby "Blue" Bland, Rod Stewart and Isaac Hayes.

Other popular tracks for Ingram included "Ain't That Loving You (For More Reasons Than One)", "Let's Steal Away to the Hideaway" and "I'll Be Your Shelter (In Time of Storm)".  He also co-authored "Respect Yourself", a million seller for the Staple Singers, on the Stax label, in 1971.  The acetate demo version of Ingram's, "Exus Trek" (an instrumental backing-track released 1966 as the B-side of HIB Records #698), became a sought after Northern soul track.  With the Stax connections, Ingram recorded at the Memphis label's studios, as well as other southern-based studios such as Muscle Shoals.  Ingram was opening act for Isaac Hayes for some years, and often used Hayes' Movement band and female backing group for his 1970s recordings. He recorded into the 1980s, and whilst only managing lower R&B chart hits.  He performed in concert until his health began declining in the mid-1990s.

Death 
Ingram died on March 19, 2007, at a Belleville, Illinois, hospital of heart failure. According to his wife Jacqui Ingram, he had suffered for years from diabetes, kidney disease and partial blindness. His funeral was at St. Augustine of Hippo Catholic Church in East St. Louis, Illinois and buried at Mount Carmel Catholic Cemetery in Belleville.

Discography

Albums 

 1972: I've Been Here All The Time (KoKo)
 1972: (If Loving You Is Wrong) I Don't Want To Be Right (KoKo)
 1976: Let's Steal Away To The Hideaway (KoKo)
 1977: Do You Love Somebody (KoKo)
 1986: Luther Ingram (Profile)

Charted singles

References

External links
 Official website
Luther Ingram on AllMusic
 Obituary, The Independent, 7 April 2007
 The complete Luther Ingram discography at Soul Express
 

1937 births
2007 deaths
People from Jackson, Tennessee
People from Alton, Illinois
Songwriters from Illinois
American pop musicians
Songwriters from Tennessee
American soul musicians
Singers from Tennessee
Smash Records artists
American rhythm and blues singers
American soul singers
20th-century American singers
20th-century American male singers
African-American Catholics
20th-century African-American male singers
American male songwriters